Kum-song, also spelled Geum-seong, is a Korean unisex given name. Its meaning differs based on the hanja used to write each syllable of the name. There are 14 hanja with the reading "Kum" and 27 hanja with the reading "Song" on South Korean government's official list of hanja which may be used in given names. One common pair of hanja used to write this name mean "golden castle".

People with this name include:
Chang Kum-song (1977–2006), niece of North Korean leader Kim Jong-il
Ri Kum-song (born 1980), North Korean male marathon runner
Hong Kum-song (born 1990), North Korean male footballer
Hwang Kum-song, North Korean swimmer, participant in Synchronized swimming at the 2006 Asian Games – Women's team
Seok Geum-seong, South Korean actress, recipient of the 1983 Special Achievement Award in the Korean Association of Film Critics Awards

See also
Kaneshiro, a Japanese surname also written with the hanja meaning "golden castle"
Geumseong (disambiguation)

References

Korean unisex given names